Vasilios Poghosyan (born 4 May 1998) is a Greek-Armenian professional footballer who plays as a defensive midfielder for Super League club Ionikos.

References

1998 births
Living people
Super League Greece 2 players
Football League (Greece) players
Gamma Ethniki players
Super League Greece players
Ionikos F.C. players
Association football midfielders
Greek people of Armenian descent
Footballers from Athens
Greek footballers